The following television stations operate on virtual channel 12 in the United States:

 K03CS-D in Broadus, Montana
 K04PJ-D in Hesperus, Colorado
 K05GQ-D in Kooskia, Idaho
 K07AAI-D in Reno, Nevada
 K08PF-D in Leamington, Utah
 K08PJ-D in Cedar City, Utah
 K08PK-D in Bullhead City, Arizona
 K09JG-D in Malta, Montana
 K10AD-D in Vallecito, Colorado
 K11KO-D in Kamiah, Idaho
 K11WM-D in Townsend, Montana
 K12MD-D in Sleetmute, Alaska
 K12XO-D in Midland/Odessa, Texas
 K13AAQ-D in Prineville, etc., Oregon
 K14IO-D in Pierre, South Dakota
 K14SB-D in Terrace Lakes, Idaho
 K15AS-D in Saco, Montana
 K15BP-D in Grants Pass, Oregon
 K15DS-D in Newport, etc., Oregon
 K15KJ-D in Gold Hill, Oregon
 K16DL-D in Zuni Pueblo, New Mexico
 K16LN-D in Pendleton, Oregon
 K16LP-D in Paradise, California
 K17BA-D in Yreka, California
 K17GV-D in Rainier, Oregon
 K17JI-D in Fresno, California
 K17OE-D in Colorado Springs, Colorado
 K18GU-D in Ottumwa, Iowa
 K18KT-D in Chinook, Montana
 K19GA-D in Susanville, etc., California
 K19KX-D in Keokuk, Iowa
 K19LP-D in Clovis, New Mexico
 K20BP-D in Phillips County, Montana
 K20GT-D in Indian Village, New Mexico
 K20HT-D in Rockaway Beach, Oregon
 K21BG-D in Jacksonville, Oregon
 K21DE-D in Seaside-Astoria, Oregon
 K21EG-D in Golden Valley, Arizona
 K21LW-D in Gazelle, California
 K21OD-D in Many Farms, Arizona
 K21OG-D in Bayfield, Colorado
 K22LY-D in Baker Valley, Oregon
 K22NW-D in Boulder, Colorado
 K22NX-D in Juliaetta, Idaho
 K23AA-D in Beatrice, Nebraska
 K23DK-D in Meadview, Arizona
 K23HT-D in St. Maries, Idaho
 K24GO-D in Blair, Nebraska
 K24IM-D in Keosauqua, Iowa
 K25GE-D in Durango, Colorado
 K25OG-D in Falls City, Nebraska
 K25PJ-D in Chloride, Arizona
 K25MK-D in Camp Verde, Arizona
 K25MZ-D in Conrad, Montana
 K25NZ-D in Lewiston, Idaho
 K25OJ-D in La Grande, Oregon
 K25OP-D in Kellogg, Idaho
 K26GF-D in Peach Springs, Arizona
 K26NQ-D in Hood River, Oregon
 K26OD-D in Globe, Arizona
 K27OR-D in Klagetoh, Arizona
 K28CQ-D in Hood River, Oregon
 K28GT-D in Crownpoint, New Mexico
 K28JD-D in Fort Madison, Iowa
 K28OV-D in Madras, Oregon
 K28PO-D in Lake Havasu City, Arizona
 K29KD-D in Delta, Utah
 K29NI-D in Cave Junction, Oregon
 K29NO-D in The Dalles, Oregon
 K30EK-D in Dulce & Lumberton, New Mexico
 K30EW-D in Monument, etc., Oregon
 K30LC-D in Tampico, etc., Montana
 K30MW-D in Sweetgrass, etc., Montana
 K31NT-D in Jackson, Minnesota
 K31OI-D in Beryl, Modena etc., Utah
 K31PS-D in Lakeshore, California
 K32DK-D in Watertown, South Dakota
 K33AC-D in Pawnee City, Nebraska
 K33FS-D in La Grande, Oregon
 K34DN-D in Whitewater, Montana
 K34PK-D in Tohatchi, New Mexico
 K35CR-D in Tillamook, etc., Oregon
 K35EI-D in Dolan Springs, Arizona
 K35FO-D in Milton-Freewater, Oregon
 K35JX-D in Westwood, California
 K35MJ-D in Grangeville, Idaho
 K35MX-D in Kingman, Arizona
 K35NT-D in Parowan/Enoch/Para, Utah
 K36CW-D in Dodson, Montana
 K36HM-D in Fort Dick, California
 K36LZ-D in Garden Valley, Idaho
 K36PV-D in Gallup, New Mexico
 K36PY-D in Pagosa Springs, Colorado
 K36QB-D in Cortez, Colorado
 K42DD-D in Joplin, Montana
 K44JP-D in Cottage Grove, Oregon
 K49LO-D in Red Lake, Minnesota
 KAMU-TV in College Station, Texas
 KBDI-TV in Broomfield, Colorado
 KBMT in Beaumont, Texas
 KCCW-TV in Walker, Minnesota
 KCOY-TV in Santa Maria, California
 KDRV in Medford, Oregon
 KETZ in El Dorado, Arkansas
 KEYC-TV in Mankato, Minnesota
 KFVS-TV in Cape Girardeau, Missouri
 KGTF in Hagåtña, Guam
 KHLM-LD in Houston, Texas
 KHSL-TV in Chico, California
 KIIN in Iowa City, Iowa
 KJOU-LD in Bakersfield, California
 KMAU in Wailuku, Hawaii
 KMYU in St. George, Utah
 KNRR in Pembina, North Dakota
 KOBF in Farmington, New Mexico
 KODE-TV in Joplin, Missouri
 KOPA-CD in Gillette, Wyoming
 KPNX in Mesa, Arizona
 KPSN-LD in Payson, Arizona
 KPTV in Portland, Oregon
 KQSL-LD in San Rafael, California
 KRNE-TV in Merriman, Nebraska
 KSAT-TV in San Antonio, Texas
 KSGW-TV in Sheridan, Wyoming
 KSLA in Shreveport, Louisiana
 KSQA in Topeka, Kansas
 KTBV-LD in Los Angeles, California
 KTRV-TV in Nampa, Idaho
 KTTM in Huron, South Dakota
 KTVH-DT in Helena, Montana
 KTWC-LD in Crockett, Texas
 KTXE-LD in San Angelo, Texas
 KTXS-TV in Sweetwater, Texas
 KUID-TV in Moscow, Idaho
 KUIL-LD in Beaumont, Texas
 KUON-TV in Lincoln, Nebraska
 KUTF in Logan, Utah
 KVHP-LD in Jasper, Texas
 KVIH-TV in Clovis, New Mexico
 KVOS-TV in Bellingham, Washington
 KWCH-DT in Hutchinson, Kansas
 KWET in Cheyenne, Oklahoma
 KXII in Sherman, Texas
 KXIP-LD in Paris, Texas
 KXMB-TV in Bismarck, North Dakota
 KYAV-LD in Palm Springs, California
 W05AW-D in Christiansted, U.S. Virgin Islands
 W21CX-D in Mayaguez, Puerto Rico
 WBNG-TV in Binghamton, New York
 WBOY-TV in Clarksburg, West Virginia
 WBPA-LD in Pittsburgh, Pennsylvania
 WBQP-CD in Pensacola, Florida
 WCTI-TV in New Bern, North Carolina
 WDEF-TV in Chattanooga, Tennessee
 WDNV-LD in Athens, Georgia
 WHDC-LD in Charleston, South Carolina
 WHYY-TV in Wilmington, Delaware
 WICU-TV in Erie, Pennsylvania
 WILL-TV in Urbana, Illinois
 WINM in Angola, Indiana
 WISN-TV in Milwaukee, Wisconsin
 WJFW-TV in Rhinelander, Wisconsin
 WJRT-TV in Flint, Michigan
 WJTV in Jackson, Mississippi
 WKRC-TV in Cincinnati, Ohio
 WMAE-TV in Booneville, Mississippi
 WMEB-TV in Orono, Maine
 WOLE-DT in Aguadilla, Puerto Rico
 WPEC in West Palm Beach, Florida
 WPRI-TV in Providence, Rhode Island
 WPRQ-LD in Clarksdale, Mississippi
 WRDW-TV in Augusta, Georgia
 WSFA in Montgomery, Alabama
 WTJX-TV in Charlotte Amalie, U.S. Virgin Islands
 WTLV in Jacksonville, Florida
 WWBT in Richmond, Virginia
 WWDG-CD in Rome, New York
 WXII-LD in Cedar, Michigan
 WXII-TV in Winston-Salem, North Carolina
 WYES-TV in New Orleans, Louisiana

The following stations, which are no longer licensed, formerly operated on virtual channel 12:
 K04DD-D in Weaverville, California
 K09WP-D in Checkerboard, Montana
 K17LN-D in Gold Beach, Oregon
 K20BI-D in Nesika Beach, Oregon
 K22LB-D in Squaw Valley, Oregon
 K27JJ-D in Forbes/Jasper County, Texas
 K40IK-D in Wallowa, Oregon
 K43NZ-D in Port Orford, Oregon
 KBMT-LD in Beaumont, Texas

References

12 virtual